Lone Rock is a hamlet in the west central region of the Canadian province of Saskatchewan.

Demographics 

References

Designated places in Saskatchewan
Organized hamlets in Saskatchewan
Wilton No. 472, Saskatchewan
Division No. 17, Saskatchewan